Robert A. Campbell (July 2, 1865November 6, 1947) was a Michigan politician.

Early life
Campbell was born to parents William and Caroline E. Campbell on July 2, 1865 in Toronto, Ontario, Canada.

Career
Campbell was appointed to the position of Treasurer of the University of Michigan by the Board of Regents of the University of Michigan on June 27, 1911. He served in this position until 1931. From 1925 to 1927, Campbell served as the mayor of Ann Arbor, Michigan. Campbell was defeated in an election in 1927. Campbell returned as mayor from 1933 to 1937.

Personal life
Campbell was married to Maria S. Holmes.

Death
Campbell died on November 6, 1947 in Ann Arbor, Michigan. Campbell was interred at Lakeside Cemetery in Port Huron, Michigan.

References

1865 births
1947 deaths
Michigan Republicans
Politicians from Toronto
University of Michigan faculty
Mayors of Ann Arbor, Michigan
Burials in Michigan
20th-century American politicians